Harrods Hill is a neighborhood in southwestern Lexington, Kentucky, United States. Its boundaries are Harrodsburg Road to the east, Man o' War Boulevard to the south, and the Beaumont Centre neighborhood to the north and west. The boundary is based on when development occurred, as Harrods Hill is the older section. The smaller Harrodsview neighborhood is typically included in Harrods Hill for statistical purposes.

Development of Harrods Hill began in the late 1970s and the last home was constructed in 1997.

Neighborhood statistics

 Population: 645
 Land area: 
 Population density: 2,184
 Median household income (2010): $96,764

References

Neighborhoods in Lexington, Kentucky